Vitali Yuryevich Vodopyanov (born 12 September 1974) is a former Russian professional football player.

Club career
He made his Russian Football National League debut for FC Lada Togliatti on 27 June 1992 in a game against FC Rubin-TAN Kazan.

External links
 

1974 births
Sportspeople from Tolyatti
Living people
Russian footballers
Association football goalkeepers
FC Lada-Tolyatti players
FC Neftyanik Ufa players
FC Sodovik Sterlitamak players
FC Bashinformsvyaz-Dynamo Ufa players
FC Chita players